Semerah (Jawi; سميره; ）is a town in both Batu Pahat District and Muar District in Johor, Malaysia.

This town is basically a main street with old shop houses and a road to Semerah wet market (Pasar Semerah). They are mainly of wooden structure with little or no civil foundation; some were rebuilt into concrete structure after fire damage or own effort. The east part of Semereh is within Muar town. There is a prominent Chinese Temple known as Tokong Kwang Yim Keng which was established before 1938, it is a prominent landmark and tourist attraction for the town.

Villages
 Sarang Buaya

Neighbouring towns

References

Batu Pahat District
Muar District
Towns in Johor